Colangelo is a surname. Notable people with the surname include:

 Bryan Colangelo (born 1965), American basketball executive
 Jerry Colangelo (born 1939), American businessman and sports mogul, father of Bryan
 Mike Colangelo (born 1976), American baseball player